Damien Webber (born 8 October 1968) is an English former professional footballer who played in the Football League, as a defender.

References

Sources

Profile at PlayerHistory

1968 births
Living people
People from Rustington
English footballers
Association football defenders
Crawley Town F.C. players
Bognor Regis Town F.C. players
Millwall F.C. players
Worthing F.C. players
Burgess Hill Town F.C. players
Southwick F.C. players
English Football League players
Three Bridges F.C. players
Footballers from West Sussex